Zhàn zhuāng (站樁/站桩) is a training method often practiced by students of neijia (internal kung fu), such as  , Xing Yi Quan, Bagua Zhang and Taiji Quan. Zhàn zhuāng is sometimes translated Standing-on-stake, Standing Qigong, Standing Like a Tree, Post-standing, Pile-standing, or Pylon Standing.

History
The original Zhàn zhuāng were health methods used by Daoists; in recent centuries, martial artists who already had static standing methods combined these with the internal mechanics of Zhàn zhuāng to create a superior exercise. The goal of Zhàn zhuāng in martial arts has always been to develop a martially capable body structure, but nowadays most practitioners have again returned to a health-preservation orientation in their training, and few teach Zhàn zhuāng as a martial method.

The word Zhàn zhuāng is the modern term; it was coined by Wang Xiangzhai. Wang, a student of Xing Yi Quan, created a method of Kung Fu-based entirely upon Zhàn zhuāng, known as Yiquan, "Intent Fist." Yiquan's method of study is Zhàn zhuāng plus movements that continue the feeling of the Standing Post in action.

The most common Zhàn zhuāng method is known as Hún Yuán (浑圆, "Completely Round," "Round Smoothness") or Chēng Bào (撑抱, "Tree Hugging" stance). This posture is entirely Daoist in its origins, has many variations, and is the main training posture in all branches of Yiquan. This practice has recently also become common practice in Taiji and Qigong schools. In Xing Yi Quan, the practice of Sān Tǐ Shì (三體勢 / 三体势, Heaven, Earth, and Man) has been a root practice for centuries.

Detail 

Those unfamiliar with Zhàn zhuāng can experience severe muscle fatigue and subsequent trembling at first. Later, once sufficient stamina and strength have been developed, the practitioner can use Zhàn zhuāng to work on developing the sensation of "opposing forces," as well as one's central equilibrium and sensitivity to specific areas of tension in the body.

Zhàn zhuāng has a strong connection with Traditional Chinese Medicine. Some schools use the practice as a way of removing blockages in Qi flow, believing Zhàn zhuāng, when correctly practiced, has a normalizing effect on the body; they claim any habitual tension or tissue shortening (or lengthening) is normalized by the practice, and the body regains its natural ability to function optimally. It is claimed that a normalized body will be less prone to muscular-skeletal medical conditions, and it is also believed that Zhàn zhuāng, when practiced for developing relaxed postures, will lead to a beneficial calming effect. The Dan Tian is also involved in the practice of Zhàn zhuāng.

The amount of time spent practicing Zhàn zhuāng varies between styles and schools; one may spend anywhere from two minutes to two hours standing in one posture.

Many styles, especially the internal styles, combine Post Standing with Qigong training and other coordinated-body methods to develop whole-body coordination for martial purposes. The martial practice is thought to strengthen the body's Central Nervous System and develop the coordination required for effective martial performance. In Yiquan, a clear distinction is made between health postures and martially oriented postures. In Bagua Zhang's circle-walking practice, the upper body is held as a Zhàn zhuāng posture, while the lower body is more dynamic.

See also 
 Xing Yi Quan
 Neigong
 Neijia
 Qigong

References

Books
 J.P.C. Moffett, Wang Xuanjie (1994), Traditional Chinese Therapeutic Exercises: Standing Pole.
 Lam Kam Chuen, Gaia Books Ltd, 1991 (2005) , "Chi Kung: The Way of Energy".
 Lam Kam Chuen, Gaia Books Ltd, 2003 , "The Way of Power: Reaching Full Strength in Body and Mind".
 Peter den Dekker, Back2Base Publishing BV, 2010 , "The Dynamics of Standing Still"
 Professor Yu Yong Nian, Amazon (2012) "El arte de nutrir la vida. Zhang zhuang el poder de la quietud"
 Jonathan Bluestein (2014). Research of Martial Arts. Amazon CreateSpace. .
 Mark Cohen, MSC Creative Enterprises, 2013, "Inside Zhan Zhuang".

External links
A Zhan Zhuang internet/bibliographic reference for practitioners
Zhan Zhuang - The Foundation of Internal Martial Arts
Explanations of Internal Training methods in the practice of Zhan Zhuang
Translation of 'The Science of Nei Jia Quan' - a book explaining the mechanics of Nei Gong practice, including that of Zhan Zhuang

Qigong
Chinese martial arts terminology
Meditation